Pete Michels is an American animation director who is the supervising director of Future-Worm! on Disney XD. Prior, he was a supervising director on seasons 1 and 2 of Rick and Morty, an animation and supervising director on Family Guy, and supervising director of the short-lived TV show Kid Notorious. He started working on The Simpsons in 1990 as a background layout artist, and eventually became a director. He has also been a director on Rugrats, Rocko's Modern Life, and Bless the Harts.

Michels grew up in Little Ferry, New Jersey. He attended Ridgefield Park High School and graduated as part of the class of 1983. He graduated from Jersey City State College, where a course in animation sparked further interest and led him to attend a graduate program at the University of California, Los Angeles, which led to his career in animation.

The Simpsons episodes
He has directed the following The Simpsons episodes:
"Brother from Another Series"
"The Cartridge Family"
"Das Bus"
"Lost Our Lisa"
"When You Dish Upon a Star"
"Homer to the Max"
"They Saved Lisa's Brain"
"Treehouse of Horror X"
"Poppa's Got a Brand New Badge"
"Strong Arms of the Ma"
"Brake My Wife, Please"

Family Guy episodes
He has directed the following Family Guy episodes:
"The Kiss Seen Around the World"
"Screwed the Pooch"
"Family Guy Viewer Mail#1"
"Fast Times at Buddy Cianci Jr. High"
"Stewie Griffin: The Untold Story"
"Chick Cancer"
"No Chris Left Behind"
"Padre de Familia"
"The Former Life of Brian"
"FOX-y Lady"
"Brian's Got a Brand New Bag"
"Business Guy"
"Quagmire's Dad"
"New Kidney in Town"
"Foreign Affairs"
"Livin' on a Prayer"
"Tea Peter"
"Space Cadet"
"12 and a Half Angry Men"
"Quagmire's Quagmire"

Bless the Harts episodes
"Hug N' Bugs"
"Pig Trouble in Little Greenpoint"
"Miracle on Culpepper Slims Boulevard"
"My Best Frenda"

References

External links
 

Living people
Place of birth missing (living people)
Year of birth missing (living people)
American animators
American animated film directors
American television directors
New Jersey City University alumni
People from Little Ferry, New Jersey
Ridgefield Park High School alumni
University of California, Los Angeles alumni